Zygaena brizae is a species of moth in the Zygaenidae family. It is found in France, Italy, Austria, the Czech Republic, Poland, Slovakia, Hungary, the Balkan Peninsula, Moldova, Ukraine, Russia and Georgia.

Technical description and variation (Seitz) 

Z. brizae Esp. (= scabiosae Hbn.) Smaller and weaker than the previous species,[ Zygaena purpuralis ] with considerably shorter antenna. The red wedge-spots are confluent, the basal two-thirds of forewing, apart from
hindmargin, being all red, the distal edge of this area being straight and parallel to the edge of the wing. Extends from the Tyrol eastwards into Western Asia. — In erebus Stgr. (= manni Kirby) [ now Zygaena mana Kirby, 1892 ], from Armenia, the hindwing is more broadly edged with black, which is the case also in gallica Oberth. [ now Zygaena nevadensis ssp. gallica Oberthür, 1898 ] from Digne, the red colour of forewing being somewhat reduced in this form. — corycia Stgr. from Syria, is rather intensity coloured, but is very much smaller than typical brizae; the forewing strongly rounded and almost elliptical; the black marginal band of hindwing narrow but sharply marked. — Also of brizae there occur specimens with the red streaks interrupted: ab. interrupta Hirschke, and individuals with red abdominal belt: ab. cingulata Dziurz. — Larva grey-yellow; subdorsally black velvety spots behind which there are yellow spots, these bearing black setiferous dots; stigmata, pectoral legs and head black, the last with a light edged frontal triangle. The blackish, posteriorly yellow pupa, lies in a silvery white cocoon.

Subspecies
Zygaena brizae brizae
Zygaena brizae araratensis Reiss, 1935
Zygaena brizae burssensis Reiss, 1928
Zygaena brizae corycia Staudinger, 1871
Zygaena brizae drvarica Rauch, 1977
Zygaena brizae lycaonica Reiss, 1935
Zygaena brizae ochrida Holik, 1937
Zygaena brizae staudingeriana Reiss, 1932
Zygaena brizae tbilisica Reiss & Reiss, 1973
Zygaena brizae trikalica Reiss, 1977
Zygaena brizae tsibilisica G. & H. Reiss, 1973
Zygaena brizae vesubiana Le Charles, 1933

Biology
The larva feeds on Cirsium arvense. The moth flies in June and July.

References

Moths described in 1800
Zygaena
Moths of Europe
Moths of Asia